Nataliya Kyshchuk (original name: Наталія Кищук; Also written as: Natalya Kishchuk or Наталья Кищук; born 27 May 1968) is a road cyclist from Ukraine. She competed at 1992 Summer Olympics without representing a nation as part of the Unified Team in the women's road race. She represented Ukraine at the 1996 Summer Olympics in the women's road race.

References

External links
 profile at sports-reference.com

1968 births
Living people
Ukrainian female cyclists
Cyclists at the 1992 Summer Olympics
Cyclists at the 1996 Summer Olympics
Olympic cyclists of Ukraine
Sportspeople from Liptovský Mikuláš
Olympic cyclists of the Unified Team